Oddur or Oddr is an Icelandic given name that may refer to

Oddur Gottskálksson (c. 1514–1556), Icelandic translator
Oddur Olafson (1888–1972), Canadian politician 
Oddur Pétursson (born 1931), Icelandic cross-country skier
Oddur Sigurðsson (born 1959), Icelandic Olympic sprinter
Odd Snorrason, 12th century Icelandic author
Guðmundur Oddur Magnússon, Icelandic artist